Chabuk is a 2022 Indian Marathi-language film directed by Kalpesh Bhandarkar and produced by Shrishti Motion Picture Company. Chabuk was scheduled to be theatrical release on 25 February 2022.

Cast 

 Sameer Dharmadhikari as Anant 
 Smita Shewale as Vaibhavi
 Sudhir Gadgil as Pitar
 Advait Vaidya

 Millind Shinde as Pind

Filming 
Chabuk was filmed in Nashik, Maharashtra.

Soundtrack 
Music is given by Vipin Patwa.

References

External links  

  

2020s Marathi-language films
2022 films